Grafton Dulany Cushing (August 4, 1864 – May 31, 1939) was an American teacher, lawyer and politician who served as 45th Lieutenant Governor for the Commonwealth of Massachusetts from 1915 to 1916.

Biography
He was born on August 4, 1864.

Cushing received his preparatory education at the Noble School, he then went to Harvard College graduating in 1885, and Harvard Law School from where he graduated in 1888.

He died on May 31, 1939.

See also
 134th Massachusetts General Court (1913)
 135th Massachusetts General Court (1914)

References

1864 births
Politicians from Boston
Harvard Law School alumni
Massachusetts lawyers
Republican Party members of the Massachusetts House of Representatives
Lieutenant Governors of Massachusetts
Speakers of the Massachusetts House of Representatives
1939 deaths
Noble and Greenough School alumni
Harvard College alumni
Cushing family